Acravally is a townland in County Antrim, Northern Ireland. It is situated in the historic barony of Cary and the civil parish of Culfeightrin and covers an area of 31 acres.

The name derives from the Irish:  (acre of the old tree).

The population of the townland decreased during the 19th century:

See also 
List of townlands in County Antrim

References

Townlands of County Antrim
Barony of Cary